Clay County High School may refer to:

Clay County High School (Kentucky), in Clay County, Kentucky
Clay County High School (Tennessee), in Clay County, Tennessee
Clay County School District (Alabama), formerly in the Clay County, Alabama, School District